Uche Kalu (born 16 May 1986) is a Nigerian football player who plays for Altyn Asyr FK in the Turkmenistan Higher League.

He is not related to former Enyimba teammate Henry Uche nor fellow Nigeria international and India-based midfielder Kalu Uche.

Career
In 2007, he was named as "Most Valuable Player" in the Nigerian Premier League after joining Enyimba from second-level team Bussdor United F.C. He however struggled with injuries the next few years. After a failed transfer attempt to Botola team Wydad Casablanca in February 2012, he rejoined Enyimba.

He moved to Turkish second-tier team Çaykur Rizespor in August 2012, and had a goal and assist in his debut.

In January 2014, Uche Kalu joined Adanaspor on a loan deal.

In January 2015, Kalu went on trial with Kazakhstan Premier League side FC Tobol, signing a year-long contract with the club on 6 February 2015.

Kalu returned to Adanaspor in January 2016, signing a one and half year contract.

On 24 April 2016 Adanaspor guaranteed to play in the first tier of Turkish football after 12 years. Kalu Uche played a very pig part in this success story.

In August 2019, Niger Uche Kalu and Kenya Peter Opiyo signed a contract with FC Altyn Asyr from Turkmenistan. This is the first foreign footballer in the history of the club and the first legionnaire in the 2019 Ýokary Liga season.

International career
He was a member of the Nigeria B team that won the 2010 WAFU Nations Cup.
His regained form saw him called up by Nigeria coach Stephen Keshi in 2012. He made his senior debut in the Eagles' 0-0 tie against Angola in January 2012. He scored his first goal in a friendly later that year against Egypt.

References

1986 births
Living people
Nigerian footballers
Sportspeople from Lagos
Association football forwards
Enyimba F.C. players
Çaykur Rizespor footballers
Adanaspor footballers
FC Tobol players
Gaziantep F.K. footballers
Al-Markhiya SC players
Süper Lig players
TFF First League players
Kazakhstan Premier League players
Nigeria international footballers
Nigerian expatriate footballers
Nigerian expatriate sportspeople in Turkey
Nigerian expatriate sportspeople in Kazakhstan
Nigerian expatriate sportspeople in Turkmenistan
Expatriate footballers in Turkey
Expatriate footballers in Kazakhstan
Expatriate footballers in Turkmenistan
Bussdor United F.C. players